Eladio Victoria y Victoria (July 30, 1864 in Baní – July 27, 1939 in Santiago de los Caballeros) was a Dominican politician.  He served as the 32nd president of the Dominican Republic from December 5, 1911, until November 30, 1912. His entire presidency coincided with the Dominican Civil War of 1911–12. He was succeeded in the presidency by his co-brother-in-law Monsignor Adolfo Alejandro Nouel.

Victoria was  French. He was great-granduncle of Arístides and Alexis Victoria Yeb.

References

Biography at the Enciclopedia Virtual Dominicana

1864 births
1939 deaths
20th-century Dominican Republic politicians
Dominican Republic people of French descent
People from Peravia Province
Presidents of the Dominican Republic
White Dominicans